Aage Emborg   (August 23, 1883 – 1953) was a Danish composer.

See also
List of Danish composers

References
This article was initially translated from the Danish Wikipedia.

Danish composers
Male composers
1883 births
1953 deaths
20th-century male musicians